Dick Best (born 22 September 1954) is a former rugby union coach, and current journalist.

Best was Director of Rugby at London Irish.

He coached the England national team. England won 13 and lost two of the 17 games played when Best was their coach.

He was a coach on the 1993 British Lions tour to New Zealand.<ref></ref

References

External links
  The Daily Telegraph article by Best.
  Article from 1999 when Best was being touted for England again.

British & Irish Lions coaches
England national rugby union team coaches
1954 births
Living people